Johann Heinrich Eckhardt may refer to:

 Johann Heinrich Eckhardt (typographer), German publisher
 Johann-Heinrich Eckhardt, German military personnel